Józef Morozewicz (27 March 1865 – 12 June 1941) was a Polish mineralogist and petrologist. He was the founder and first director of the National Geological Institute (Państwowy Instytut Geologiczny) from 1919-1937, as well as the founder and first president of the League of Protection of Nature (Liga Ochrony Przyrody).

External links

Further reading
 

1865 births
1941 deaths
Polish mineralogists
Petrologists